Hypericum gymnanthum, the small-flowered St. John's wort or clasping leaf St. John's wort, is a species of flowering plant in the St. John's wort family Hypericaceae native to wet woods, bogs, and ditches of the eastern United States and Guatemala. It has been introduced to Poland.

It was first formally described in 1845.

References

gymnanthum
Plants described in 1845
Flora of North America
Flora of Central America